Jimmie Charles Hall (born November 29, 1947) is an American politician who served as a member of the New Mexico House of Representatives for District 28 from January 2005 to January 2019.

Early life and education
Hall was born in McCamey, Texas. He earned a Bachelor of Science degree in animal science and Master of Arts in agriculture from West Texas State University (now West Texas A&M University).

Career 
Prior to entering politics, Hall served in the United States Army and was the CEO of a bank.

Elections
In 2004, District 28 incumbent Rory Ogle was unopposed for the June 1, 2004 Republican primary but withdrew. Hall replaced him on the November 2, 2004 General election ballot and was unopposed, winning with 9,338 votes.
In 2006, Hall was unopposed for the June 6, 2006 Republican primary, winning with 1,104 votes and won the November 7, 2006 general election with 5,916 votes (56.4%) against Democratic nominee Shay Rose.
In 2008, Hall and returning 2006 Democratic challenger Shay Rose were both unopposed for their June 8, 2008 primaries. Hall won the November 4, 2008 General election, winning with 7,274 votes (53.6%) against Rose.
In 2010, Hall was challenged in the June 1, 2010 Republican primary but won with 2,292 votes (84.2%) and won the November 2, 2010 general election with 6,170 votes (60.9%) against Democratic nominee Cornelia Wells Lange.
In 2012, Hall was unopposed for both the June 5, 2012 Republican Primary, winning with 1,948 votes and the November 6, 2012 General election, winning with 10,815 votes.

References

External links
Official page at the New Mexico Legislature
Campaign site

Jimmie Hall at Ballotpedia
Jimmie C. Hall at the National Institute on Money in State Politics

1947 births
Living people
Republican Party members of the New Mexico House of Representatives
Politicians from Albuquerque, New Mexico
People from McCamey, Texas
United States Army officers
West Texas A&M University alumni
21st-century American politicians
Military personnel from Texas